The women's shot put event  at the 1992 European Athletics Indoor Championships was held in Palasport di Genova on 1 March.

Results

References

Results

Shot put at the European Athletics Indoor Championships
Shot
1992 in women's athletics